Emma Manix-Geeves (born 12 August 2000) is an Australian cricketer who plays as a right-handed batter and wicket-keeper for the Tasmanian Tigers in the Women's National Cricket League (WNCL). She made her Tasmania debut on 22 September 2019 against Western Australia, making one stumping and scoring two runs. She was a member of the Hobart Hurricanes squad for the 2019–20 Women's Big Bash League season, making five appearances.

References

External links

2000 births
Living people
Australian women cricketers
Hobart Hurricanes (WBBL) cricketers
Place of birth missing (living people)
Tasmanian Tigers (women's cricket) cricketers